The Pacific Pinball Museum is a Board Managed and certified 501 C(3) nonprofit interactive museum/arcade offering a chronological and historical selection of rare bagatelles and early pinball games in addition to over 100 playable pinball machines ranging in era from the 1940s to present day located on Webster Street in Alameda, California.

Throughout the 7,000 sq/ft museum  are hand-painted murals, vintage Jukeboxes, educational handouts and rotating focused exhibits. There are also provisions for field-trips, self guided tours, educated docents and STEAM educational programs as part of the museum's "Play & Learn" philosophy.

History
 
The museum was founded in 2004 by Michael Schiess, a former museum exhibition designer. Schiess started collecting pinball machines in 2001. He decided to open his own museum after being unimpressed with the coverage of pinball history at other museums. One the first major acquisitions was thirty-six machines in one purchase. Fourteen of them were installed in a rented buildings rear parking lot facing room, which Schiess called "Lucky Ju Ju", in Alameda and a jar was placed out for donations. In 2004 the facility grew and became a nonprofit, renaming itself the Pacific Pinball Museum. The museum expanded in 2009 to display forty woodrail and wedge head machines from the collection of Larry Zartarian. The museum has a gift shop that sells pinball themed merchandise, books and a variety of Pacific Pinball Museum branded shirts, hats and stickers.

Collection

The museum's exhibitions include approximately ninety playable pinball machines and additional static display pins ranging in age from 1879 until modern day. They are arranged in chronological order in the museums rooms. In total, the museums collection comprises over 1,100 unique machines. Those not on display are maintained at the 8,000-square-foot Pacific Pinball Annex nearby. Upon paying the admission fee, visitors can play any of the machines on display for the day with unlimited in and out privilege's to take breaks and get food nearby. The oldest machine on display, from 1879, is a Montague Redgrave Parlor Bagatelle. One of the special games housed (and playable) in the museum is Gottlieb's "Humpty Dumpty" from 1947, the first game with flippers. Contemporary machines include The Addams Family and the Twilight Zone. The museum also has a transparent pinball machine from 1976 that was built by Schiess and Wade Krause. It is based on the Gottlieb "Surf Champ" game. One of the most valued pieces in the collection is a mid 1930s-era Art Deco machine called the Bally Bumper. The machine was seized by police in Oakland during a gambling crackdown. The museum's collection has also been displayed at San Francisco International Airport.

Exhibits 

In addition to the playable games, the museum also maintains a permanent exhibit of early bagatelles and pinball machines from 1879 to the late 1930s showing the evolution of the game over time as well as special curated rotating exhibits. All legacy exhibits are available on the museums website for perusal.

 Pointy People Current exhibit from August 21, 2020 - Present  Taking on a new aesthetic in the mid-1960s, the style referred to as Pointy People is characterized by angular, abstracted figures. A stark contrast to the older more realistic style that dominated pinball art since the 1940s.
 The Art of Arthur Stenholm  May 25, 2017 - March 13, 2020  Beginning in 1964, Arthur "Art" Stenholm created amazing pinball game artwork for Williams, Gottlieb, and Bally for decades. Stenholm's art is distinct especially when it comes to his portrayal of women in pinball art as strong, empowering active participants.
 Gambling, Amusement, or Both? Current exhibit from March 1, 2019 to Present  This exhibit explores the history of pinball, its roots in gambling and adult-oriented entertainment, and the social forces surrounding its explosive rise in popularity.
 Pinball Style July 2, 2010 - August 1, 2010  Pinball Style: Drama and Design is an exhibition with commentary on clothing styles in pinball art from the 1940s through the 2000s. Curator Melissa Harmon looks at dramatic and historical context with a touch of fashion police humor.

Traveling Exhibitions 

The Pacific Pinball Museums machines, backglass murals, and educational exhibits have made appearances in museums and galleries around the world. A few notable places the collection has traveled are:

 The Art and Science of Pinball Chabot Space and Science Center, Oakland, CA 2017 
 Pinball! An Exhibition of Vintage Pinball Machines  Museum of American Heritage, Palo Alto, CA:  2016 
 Ausgeflippt! Phaeno Museum, Wolfsburg, Germany 2015 
 Permanent Exhibition: Transparent Pinball Machine Exploratorium, San Francisco: 2012–Present 
 From Bagatelle to Twilight Zone San Francisco Airport Museum: 2009, 2010

Mural Program 

The Pacific Pinball Mural Program was born when local Bay Area artist Dan Fontes reproduced the “Majorettes” backglass in large-scale form for the Pacific Pinball Exposition at the Marin County Civic Center in 2007. Since then, professional artists Ed Cassel, d’Arci Bruno and Eric J. Kos joined the mural team, and together they have produced over 30 large-scale interpretations of some of the finest works in pinball history. In August 2012, the Pacific Pinball Museums muralists received a matching grant from the East Bay Community Foundation, a permanent endowment of charitable funds dedicated to improving the human condition in Alameda and Contra Costa counties. The murals are hand painted on medium weight quality canvas with artist grade latex paints, and represent hundreds of hours of work. Most measure approximately 10’ X 10’ square, and are priced by the artists. All sale proceeds benefit the artist and the museum. Those interested in purchasing murals can contact the museum for more information.

Backglass Preservation Project 
During the 15month Pandemic shutdown, the Pacific Pinball Museum embarked on a historical cataloging and preservation project to bring the museum's collection to patrons virtually. A massive undertaking of photographing each machine in the collection (over 1000 games), and capturing the artwork of many rare machines in studio quality high resolution. The goal is to provide these images as a resource for both pinball fans and academic scholars alike. The Pacific Pinball Museum believes that pinball artwork can educate patrons about American history and culture, and feels that it's so important to preserve and share our collection with the public - especially when hands-on play is hard to come by. A sample of the progress is available on the museum's website searchable by keywords, game title, manufacturer or production year.

Pacific Pinball League 

The museum hosts the Pacific Pinball League on Wednesday nights beginning at 6:30PM. There are four seasons per year (with 10 weeks total per season ). Attending a minimum of three of eight regular weeks qualifies a player for Finals. League start dates are announced on the website, Pacific Pinball Social Media Accounts and the Pacific Pinball League Facebook page. Prospective players can join by coming to any league night, and the league is open to all ages and skill levels, even first-timers. Veteran players are available to show new players the basics and even some advanced skills. Players who compete in the Finals will have a World Pinball Player ranking.

References

External links

Amusement museums in the United States
Museums in Alameda County, California
Pinball museums
History museums in California
Buildings and structures in Alameda, California
2004 establishments in California
Museums established in 2004